Current Issues in Molecular Biology (CIMB) is a peer-reviewed open access journal publishing review articles and minireviews in all areas of molecular biology and molecular microbiology. According to the Journal Citation Reports, the journal has an impact factor of 2.976. It was originally published by Caister Academic Press when it was established in 1999, but has been published by MDPI since 2021.

References

External links

Molecular and cellular biology journals
Hybrid open access journals
Review journals
Publications established in 1999
English-language journals
MDPI academic journals